Ivan Aleksandrovich Gerasimov (born 11 January 1985) is a former Russian professional football player.

Club career
He played in the Russian Football National League for FC Krasnodar in 2009.

External links
 
 

1985 births
Sportspeople from Grozny
Living people
Russian footballers
Association football forwards
FC Olimpia Volgograd players
FC Krasnodar players
FC Rotor Volgograd players